Breandán Ó Buachalla (1936 – 20 May 2010) was an Irish scholar of the Irish language. According to Raidió Teilifís Éireann, he was "the leading authority on Gaelic poetry and writing in early modern Ireland" and "one of the most prominent Irish language academics of his generation". The Irish Times described him as "eminent". His magnum opus was his seventeenth century literary and political study,  Aisling Ghéar.

Ó Buachalla was born in Cork City in 1936 and went to school at Saint Nessan's Christian Brothers School. He attended University College Cork from which he obtained a degree in Celtic studies. He taught at Queen's University Belfast and was a Professor of Irish at the Dublin Institute for Advanced Studies's School of Celtic Studies for five years between 1973 and 1978. Following this Ó Buachalla was Professor of Modern Irish Language and Literature at University College Dublin for eighteen years between 1978 and 1996. He was a visiting professor at three institutes in the United States: these were the University of Notre Dame, New York University, and Boston College. He also achieved the Parnell Fellowship at the University of Cambridge in the United Kingdom. At the time of his death he was Professor of Irish at the University of Notre Dame, the only faculty of Modern Irish language outside Ireland.

He was married to Aingeal. She outlived him. The couple had three children, daughters, Bridóg and Clíona, and son, Traolach. Following his death in 2010, Minister for Tourism, Culture and Sport, Mary Hanafin, paid tribute, calling Ó Buachalla "a giant among his peers" and lamenting that "his passing is more than a personal loss to his family, it is a great loss also to the Irish language and learning".

Among his other works are I mBéal Feirste Cois Cuain, Peadar Ó Doirnín: amhráin, Nua-Dhuanaire II, Cathal Buí: amhráin, and Na Stíobhartaigh agus an tAos Léinn: King Seamas.

Breandán Ó Buachalla died on 20 May 2010 after suffering a brain haemorrhage at his home in Dublin. He was 74.

References

External links
 Profile
 "Obituary: Authority and author on early modern Irish", The Irish Times, 5 June 2010.
  explaining the Aisling poetic genre.

1936 births
2010 deaths
20th-century Irish writers
21st-century Irish writers
Academics of Queen's University Belfast
Academics of University College Dublin
Alumni of University College Cork
Boston College faculty
Linguists from the Republic of Ireland
New York University faculty
People from County Cork
University of Notre Dame faculty
Irish-language writers
Academics of the Dublin Institute for Advanced Studies